Eugenie Hirschberg-Pucher (1862 – 30 April 1937) was a Latvian poet and writer.  Most of her work was published in the Latvian German-language press in the early 1900s.

Biography
Eugenie Pucher was born in Mitau, Courland, to Rabbi Solomon Pucher and his wife Rosa. She married ophthalmologist Wilhelm (Wulff) Hirschberg in 1887. They lived in Vitebsk, Kharkov, and the Yekaterinoslav Governorate before settling permanently in Riga in 1911. There she operated a salon for local writers and artists.

She made her literary debut in 1886 with the poetry collection Schülerliebe. In 1896 she anonymously published the story Ihre Kreutzersonate, which was met with acclaim.

Publications
 
  Translated into Dutch as Hare Kreutzersonate. Uit het dagboek van Mevrouw Posdnischew.
  Translation of a poem by Simon Frug.

References

1862 births
1937 deaths
19th-century Latvian Jews
19th-century Latvian poets
19th-century pseudonymous writers
20th-century Latvian Jews
20th-century Latvian poets
European salon-holders
German-language poets
Jewish dramatists and playwrights
Jewish translators
Jewish women writers
Latvian dramatists and playwrights
Latvian women poets
People from the Governorate of Livonia
People from Kreis Riga
Pseudonymous women writers
Writers from Riga